Amischa is a genus of beetles belonging to the family Staphylinidae.

The genus was described in 1858 by Carl Gustaf Thomson.

The genus has cosmopolitan distribution.

Species:
 Amischa analis
 Amischa bifoveolata
 Amischa decipiens
 Amischa nigrofusca
 Amischa paolettii Pace

References

Staphylinidae genera
Aleocharinae